Le guêpier is a 1976 French-Italian film, directed by Roger Pigaut. It stars actor Gabriele Ferzetti.

Cast 
 Claude Brasseur - Renaud 
 Marthe Keller - Melba 
 Gabriele Ferzetti - Gaspard 
 Vicky Messica - Vava 
 Vittorio Sanipoli - Fossetti 
 John Steiner - Fisher 
 Joëlle Bernard - Sarah 
 Fernand Guiot - Navarre 
 Jacques Richard - Miro 
 Hélène Manesse - Irène 
 Popeck - Hans (as Jean Herbert)
 Henri Czarniak - Director

References

External links

1976 films
Italian crime drama films
French crime drama films
1970s Italian-language films
1970s French-language films
1970s Italian films
1970s French films
French-language Italian films